Hody is a surname. Notable people with the surname include:

John Hody (died 1441), MP
Humphrey Hody, English scholar and theologian
Les Hody, Hungarian and Australian basketball player

See also
Hody (Moravia)
Hody, Wallonia, a district of the municipality of Anthisnes, Belgium